Is It Wrong to Try to Pick Up Girls in a Dungeon? is an anime series based on the light novel series created by Fujino Ōmori. The story follows the exploits of Bell Cranel, a 14-year-old solo adventurer under the goddess Hestia.

The anime is produced by J.C.Staff. The fourth season of the anime series was announced at GA FES 2021 on January 31, 2021. It features returning staff members from previous seasons, with the addition of Fujino Ōmori, the original author, who will supervise the scripts alongside Hideki Shirane. The fourth season premiered on July 22, 2022, with the first half of the season aired till September 29, 2022, and the second half (titled DanMachi IV Deep Chapter: Calamity Arc) which aired from January 7 to March 18, 2023.


Episode list

Notes

References

External links
  
 

Is It Wrong to Try to Pick Up Girls in a Dungeon? episode lists
2022 Japanese television seasons
2023 Japanese television seasons